TSS Antwerp was a passenger vessel built for the Great Eastern Railway in 1919.

History

The ship was built by John Brown of Clydebank for the Great Eastern Railway as one of a contract for two new steamers and launched on 26 October 1919. She was placed on the Harwich to Antwerp route.

In 1923 she was acquired by the London and North Eastern Railway. On 20 November 1932 she collided with the American steamer Hastings in a thick fog off Zeebrugge, but was only lightly damaged, and able to continue her voyage.

She served as a Q-ship in World War I.

She was acquired by British Railways in 1948 and scrapped in 1951.

References

1919 ships
Steamships of the United Kingdom
Ships built on the River Clyde
Ships of the Great Eastern Railway
Ships of the London and North Eastern Railway
Ships of British Rail